The 2014 BBL Champions Cup was a basketball game that was held on September 27, 2014. Basketball Bundesliga champions FC Bayern Munich faced off against BBL-Pokal winners Alba Berlin in the O2 World in Berlin.

Match

BBL Champions Cup
Champions Cup